Harwood is a rural settlement on the northern side of the Otago Peninsula. It is within the boundaries of Dunedin city in New Zealand.

Before 2000, most of the houses were cribs, but they have since been upgraded and become permanent residences.

The area is named for Octavius Harwood and his family, who moved here from Otakou in the 1870s and farmed cattle.

Demographics

Harwood is described by Statistics New Zealand as a rural settlement.

Harwood had a population of 231 at the 2018 New Zealand census, an increase of 24 people (11.6%) since the 2013 census, and an increase of 15 people (6.9%) since the 2006 census. There were 108 households. There were 114 males and 117 females, giving a sex ratio of 0.97 males per female. The median age was 53 years (compared with 37.4 years nationally), with 39 people (16.9%) aged under 15 years, 21 (9.1%) aged 15 to 29, 114 (49.4%) aged 30 to 64, and 60 (26.0%) aged 65 or older.

Ethnicities were 93.5% European/Pākehā, 16.9% Māori, 1.3% Pacific peoples, and 2.6% other ethnicities (totals add to more than 100% since people could identify with multiple ethnicities).

Although some people objected to giving their religion, 68.8% had no religion, 15.6% were Christian, 1.3% were Buddhist and 1.3% had other religions.

Of those at least 15 years old, 39 (20.3%) people had a bachelor or higher degree, and 42 (21.9%) people had no formal qualifications. The median income was $23,000, compared with $31,800 nationally. The employment status of those at least 15 was that 69 (35.9%) people were employed full-time, 39 (20.3%) were part-time, and 9 (4.7%) were unemployed.

References

Populated places in Otago
Otago Peninsula